Gilberto Rondón (born November 18, 1953, in The Bronx, New York) is an American former professional baseball pitcher. He played for the Houston Astros and the Chicago White Sox of Major League Baseball (MLB).

Career
Rondón was first drafted by the Texas Rangers in the 14th round of the 1972 amateur draft, but did not sign. He was then drafted by the Baltimore Orioles in the 3rd round of the 1973 amateur draft. He spent the 1973 season with the rookie league Bluefield Orioles, and part of the 1974 season with the Single-A Miami Orioles before being released by the Orioles on June 12, 1974. He signed with the California Angels before the 1975 season, and spent the season with the Single-A Salinas Packers and the Double-A El Paso Diablos.

Following the 1975 season Rondón was drafted by the Houston Astros in the Rule 5 draft. He spent the entire 1976 season with the Astros, appearing in 19 games and starting in 7. He spent 1977 in the minor leagues, spending part of the season with the Double-A Columbus Astros and part with the Triple-A Charleston Charlies. His tenure with the Astros organization ended after the 1977 season, when he was drafted by the New York Yankees in the 1977 minor league draft.

Rondón spent the entire 1978 season in the Yankees organization, playing for the Single-A Fort Lauderdale Yankees and later the Double-A West Haven Yankees. Following the season he was purchased from the Yankees by the Leones de Yucatán of the Mexican League, where he spent the 1979 season. On August 1, 1979, the Chicago White Sox purchased him from the Leones, and he played for the Iowa Oaks, the White Sox Triple-A affiliate. He was called up to the major leagues again that September, and appeared in 4 games in relief for the White Sox. Following the season he was purchased back by the Leones. He then signed with the Los Angeles Dodgers and appeared in a few games for the Triple-A Albuquerque Dukes, but he never appeared in a major league game again.

His MLB career pitching line included a won–lost mark of 2–2 and no saves in 23 games pitched, with seven games started; in 63 career innings pitched, he allowed 38 earned runs on 81 hits and 45 bases on balls for an earned run average of 5.40, with 24 strikeouts. As a hitter in the National League, be batted .286 in 14 at bats.

Rondón was a coach for Puerto Rico during the 2009 World Baseball Classic.

Rondón was announced as the pitching coach for the Bravos de León of the Mexican Baseball League for the 2018 season.

Family
Rondón is the son of Diomedes Olivo and the nephew of Chi-Chi Olivo, both of whom played in MLB in the 1960s.

See also
List of second-generation Major League Baseball players

External links

1953 births
Living people
American expatriate baseball players in Mexico
American sportspeople of Dominican Republic descent
Alacranes de Campeche players
Albuquerque Dukes players
Baseball coaches from New York (state)
Bluefield Orioles players
Cangrejeros de Santurce (baseball) players
Charleston Charlies players
Chicago White Sox players
Columbus Astros players
Criollos de Caguas players
El Paso Diablos players
Fort Lauderdale Yankees players
Fort Myers Sun Sox players
Houston Astros players
Iowa Oaks players
Leones de Yucatán players
Liga de Béisbol Profesional Roberto Clemente pitchers
Major League Baseball pitchers
Mexican League baseball pitchers
Miami Orioles players
Minor league baseball coaches
Orlando Juice players
Plataneros de Tabasco players
Rojos del Águila de Veracruz players
Salinas Packers players
Saraperos de Saltillo players
Baseball players from New York City
West Haven Yankees players